is a railway station on the Kobe Municipal Subway Seishin-Yamate Line in Suma-ku, Kobe, Hyōgo Prefecture, Japan.

Layout
There is an island platform with two tracks between two side platforms under the concourse.

Surroundings
The station is located in Kobe Sports Park.
Baseball stadium (Hotto Motto Field Kobe) - approx 3 minutes on foot
Kobe Universiade Memorial Stadium - approx 7 minutes on foot
Kobe Green Arena - approx 7 minutes on foot
Tennis court - approx 10 minutes on foot

Railway stations in Japan opened in 1985
Railway stations in Hyōgo Prefecture
Stations of Kobe Municipal Subway